Madulla is a village located in the Moneragala District of Uva Province, Sri Lanka.

The village is situated on the Inginiyagala Road (B527), adjacent to the Gal Oya National Park.

See also
List of towns in Uva

External links

Populated places in Uva Province
Populated places in Monaragala District